Leucos  is a genus of fishes in the family Cyprinidae, from Southern Europe. They are carp close to the genus Rutilus, and were only recently taxonomically distinguished from that genus.

Molecular data suggest that Leucos diverged from Rutilus more than five million years ago, probably during the Messinian salinity crisis. The species of Leucos are typically of small size and they all live  in still waters. They differ from Rutilus by the lack of spinous tubercles on scales and head in reproductive males, and also in the pharyngeal teeth formula.  The sister group to Leucos is the monotypic Sarmarutilus.

Species
There are currently five recognized species in the genus:
 Leucos albus Marić, 2010
 Leucos aula Bonaparte, 1841
 Leucos basak Heckel, 1843 (Albanian roach)
 Leucos panosi Bogutskaya & Iliadou, 2006 (Acheloos roach)
 Leucos ylikiensis Economidis, 1991

References

 
Cypriniformes genera